{{DISPLAYTITLE:O2 Academy Liverpool}}

The O2 Academy Liverpool (formerly the L2 and Carling Academy Liverpool) is a music venue in Hotham Street, Liverpool, England, that is run by the Academy Music Group.

The main building consists of performance areas. O2 Academy1 can hold 1,200 (900 floor/300 balcony) people while O2 Academy2 can hold 500. There are also 5 bars in the building which cater for the visitors who come to see shows (2 in O2 Academy2 and 3 in O2Academy1.

On 6 November 2008, it was announced that Telefónica Europe (owners of the O2 Network in the UK) had become the new sponsor of all Academy venues, in a deal with music promoter Live Nation Entertainment. The deal, which lasts for five years, sees all venues rebranded "The O2 Academy", in line with Telefónica's purchase of the Millennium Dome (now The O2).

References

External links
 
 O2 Academy Liverpool Official Fan Page

Music venues in Liverpool
Buildings and structures in Liverpool
Tourist attractions in Liverpool
Academy Liverpool
Wrestling venues